Roberto Pirrello (born 30 May 1996) is an Italian professional footballer who plays as a centre back for  club Pordenone.

Club career
Pirrello made his professional debut in the Lega Pro for Siracusa on 11 September 2016 in a game against Taranto.

He was successively part of the Livorno squad that won the Serie C league in 2018. He returned to Palermo for the 2018–19 Serie B season.

Empoli
On 18 July 2019, Pirrello signed to Serie B club Empoli for free. On 29 January 2020, he was loaned to Trapani. On 31 August 2021, he moved to Cosenza on loan.

Pordenone
On 12 July 2022, Pirrello signed a four-year contract with Pordenone.

International
He represented Italy national under-17 football team at the 2013 FIFA U-17 World Cup.

References

External links
 

Living people
1996 births
People from Alcamo
Association football central defenders
Italian footballers
Italy youth international footballers
Palermo F.C. players
U.S. Livorno 1915 players
Empoli F.C. players
Trapani Calcio players
Cosenza Calcio players
Pordenone Calcio players
Serie C players
Serie B players
Footballers from Sicily
Sportspeople from the Province of Trapani